Forgewood is a suburb in the north-west of the town of Motherwell, North Lanarkshire, Scotland.  It consists mainly of housing and low-rise flats, with the majority of them now 'modernised'. Some of the older-looking flats have since been demolished. Even though Forgewood is a small residential area of Motherwell, it does contain various local services, such as a pharmacy, a post-office and a convenience store, as well as a community centre which was rebuilt in 2016. To the south-east of Forgewood is the secondary school Braidhurst High School that serves the area. Braidhurst has a school roll of around 600 pupils; comedian Tam Cowan is a former pupil.

The West Coast Main Line by-passes near the suburb, but customer service trains stop one-mile south-east at Motherwell railway station. The A721, which links to Bellshill and Wishaw, passes by Forgewood, with bus services to and from Glasgow stopping there.

References

External links

 Braidhurst Viaduct at Railscot 

Motherwell
Neighbourhoods in North Lanarkshire
Housing estates in Scotland